Scott Valley Airport , formerly CA06, is a public airport located three miles (4.8 km) south of the central business district (CBD) of Fort Jones, a city in Siskiyou County, California, USA. The airport covers 53 acres and has one runway.

References 
Airport Master Record (FAA Form 5010), also available as a printable form (PDF)
Siskiyou County Airports: Scott Valley Airport (Siskiyou County web site)

External links 

Airports in Siskiyou County, California